Canary Wharf station may refer to:
Canary Wharf tube station, on the Jubilee line of the London Underground
Canary Wharf DLR station, on the Docklands Light Railway in the northern area of the Canary Wharf complex
Heron Quays DLR station, on the Docklands Light Railway in the southern area of the Canary Wharf complex
Canary Wharf railway station, on the Elizabeth line
Canary Wharf Pier, a riverbus stop on the River Thames